Southern Virginia is a region in the U.S. state of Virginia located along the border with North Carolina. The region includes the counties of Brunswick, Charlotte, Greensville, Halifax, Henry, Lunenburg, Mecklenburg, and Pittsylvania, and the independent cities of Danville, Emporia, and Martinsville.

See also
Northern Virginia
Southside (Virginia)

Notes

Southern Virginia Tourism Region - December 17th, 2006 Virginian-Pilot Article

Geography of Virginia
Regions of Virginia